Rita Chikwelu (born 6 March 1988) is a Nigerian professional footballer who plays as a forward and midfielder for Spanish Liga F club FC Levante Las Planas and the Nigeria women's national team. She previously played for Swedish sides Umeå IK and Kristianstads DFF.

Club career
From 2006 to 2009, Chikwelu played in Finland for FC United. She was the top scorer of Finnish women's league Naisten Liiga in 2009 with 22 goals.

Chikwelu spent seven seasons with Umeå IK from 2010 to 2016, but left upon the club's relegation and joined Kristianstads DFF on a two-year contract.

International career
Chikwelu participated in the FIFA U-20 World Cup from 2004 to 2008 and made her senior national team debut in 2007 at the FIFA women's World Cup. She was a member of the Nigerian Olympic team which participated in the 2008 Summer Olympics in China and a member of the Nigerian squad in the 2011 FIFA women's World Cup.

Honours
African Women's Championship Winner: 2016, 2018

References

External links

 
 FIFA.com – Article on Rita Chikwelu
 FC United – Picture of Rita and FC United team
 FIFA.com – Photo album
 
 

1988 births
Living people
Nigerian women's footballers
Nigeria women's international footballers
2007 FIFA Women's World Cup players
Footballers at the 2008 Summer Olympics
Olympic footballers of Nigeria
2011 FIFA Women's World Cup players
Damallsvenskan players
Umeå IK players
Kristianstads DFF players
Kansallinen Liiga players
FC United (Jakobstad) players
Women's association football midfielders
Women's association football forwards
2019 FIFA Women's World Cup players
Nigerian expatriate women's footballers
Nigerian expatriate sportspeople in Finland
Expatriate women's footballers in Finland
Nigerian expatriate sportspeople in Sweden
Expatriate women's footballers in Sweden
Nigerian expatriate sportspeople in Spain
Expatriate women's footballers in Spain